The Serie C of the Brazilian Championship 2016 is a football competition being held in Brazil, equivalent to the third division. It is being contested by 20 clubs in two geographic groups.

Teams

Number of teams by state

League table

Group A

Group B

Final Stage
The final stage consists of three rounds of two-legged knock-out ties. In the quarter final, the team ranked 1st in Group A will play the team ranked 4th in Group B and so on.

Bracket
Team shown first in each tie has home advantage in the 2nd leg.

Final

Top scorers

References

Campeonato Brasileiro Série C seasons
Campeonato Brasileiro Serie C